Raw Nerve is a 1999 erotic crime drama starring Mario Van Peebles, Nicollette Sheridan, Zach Galligan and Monica Trombetta. It was directed by Avi Nesher and written by Robert H. Berger.

External links

1999 films
Films directed by Avi Nesher
1999 crime drama films